Tolly Lights (  "Tolly Lights") is a 2008 Bengali-language Indian film directed by Arjun Chakraborty and starring Sreelekha Mitra, Abhishek Chatterjee, Priyadarshini Chatterjee and Arjun Chakraborty. It is based on the novel Rangeen Prithibi by Suchitra Bhattacharya. Sunny Deol played an important, special role in the film.

Premise
Sreelekha plays the role of a home-maker who falls into the glamour world of films by chance.

Cast

Sreelekha Mitra
Abhishek Chatterjee
Samaresh Chakraborty
Komolika Bannerjee
Biswajit Chakraborty
Barun Chanda
Supriyo Tagore
Ratul Bhattacharjee
Haradan Bose
Gita Dey
Anindo Banerjee
Pradip Mukherjee
Subarna Ghosh
Rohan Dutta
Arindol Bagchi
Debjani Deb
Arindam Sil
Mita Chatterjee
Monica Chakraborty
Priyadarshini Chatterjee
Shashank Arora
Manjula Poley
Uma Basu
Amitava Bhattacharya
Kharaj Mukherjee
Arjun Chakraborty

Special appearance
Sunny Deol
Tapas Paul
Satabdi Roy
Mithun Chakraborty

Controversy 
In the 2020 controversial vlog Let's Expose It Face It, Sreelekha Mitra said that Rituparna Sengupta wanted to play the lead in the film. She made a phone call to Arjun Chakraborty and requested him to cast herself replacing Sreelekha Mitra. Sreelekha Mitra claimed that Sengupta went on persisting that she would work at a lower remuneration if Chakraborty cast her.

References

External links

 gomolo.in

2008 films
2000s Bengali-language films
Bengali-language Indian films
Films set in Kolkata
2008 directorial debut films
Films based on Indian novels
Films based on works by Suchitra Bhattacharya